Aleksandr Yakovlevich Golovin (– 17 April 1930) was a Russian artist and stage designer. He designed productions for Sergei Diaghilev, Constantin Stanislavski, and Vsevolod Meyerhold.

Born at Moscow, Golovin initially studied architecture, later switching to painting. He also attended the Académie Colarossi. Due to financial difficulties, upon graduation he worked as an interior painter and decorator. He also tried his hand at various artistic fields such as furniture design. In 1900 he took part in designing the Russian Empire pavilion at the Paris World's Fair together with his friend K.A. Korovin.
He studied at the Académie Vitti in Paris.
In 1901 he moved to the Saint Petersburg region from Moscow. It was here that he came into his own as a stage designer, combining symbolism and modernism on operatic and dramatic productions for Diaghilev, Meyerhold and others. After the Revolution of 1917, Golovin found work in theatre less and less often, and so delved into painting and graphic illustration.

Golovin provided the set design for the 1910 original production of Stravinsky's The Firebird ballet.

Golovin provided the scenic design for an important production of Pierre Beaumarchais's The Marriage of Figaro at the Moscow Art Theatre. The seminal Russian theatre practitioner Constantin Stanislavski directed the play in fast and free-flowing production that opened on 28 April 1927, having been rehearsed since the end of 1925. Stanislavski re-located the play's action to pre-Revolutionary France and trimmed its five-act structure to eleven scenes; Golovin employed a revolve to quicken scene-changes. It was a great success, garnering ten curtain calls on opening night.

Golovin was appointed a People's Artist of the RSFSR. He died in Detskoye Selo on 17 April 1930.

References

Sources

 Benedetti, Jean. 1999. Stanislavski: His Life and Art. Revised edition. Original edition published in 1988. London: Methuen. .

External links
Biography (in Russian)
 Golovin - Cvetsky theater artist. paintings (in Russian)

1863 births
1930 deaths
Ballet designers
19th-century painters from the Russian Empire
Russian male painters
20th-century Russian painters
Russian scenic designers

People's Artists of the RSFSR
Académie Colarossi alumni
19th-century male artists from the Russian Empire
20th-century Russian male artists